Simplified is the ninth studio album by Simply Red album, released in October 2005. It features new, rearranged recordings of the band's older songs, and four new songs: "Perfect Love" and an alternate version, "My Perfect Love", a cover of Leon Russell's "A Song for You", and "Smile".

Track listing
Credits adapted from Simply Red's official website.

2014 expanded edition 
Disc 2''Remixes "Perfect Love (Lazy Radio Mix)" – 3:11
 "Perfect Love (Love To Infinity Sunset Mix – Long Version)" – 7:43
 "Perfect Love (Love To Infinity Radio Mix)" – 3:33
 "Perfect Love (Kurtis Mantronik 12" Vocal Mix)" – 6:16
 "Perfect Love (Motive Hi-lectro Mix)" – 6:30
 "Perfect Love (Roger's Dirty Sanchez Mix Edit)" – 6:43
 "Perfect Love (Lee Cabrera's Lower East Side Dub)" – 6:00Live in Cuba'''
 "Perfect Love" – 3:26
 "Something Got Me Started" – 3:37
 "A Song For You" – 4:09
 "Stars" – 4:17
 "It's Only Love" – 4:30
 "Fairground" – 6:00

DVD
Feature Interview
 "Mark Goodier Interviews Mick Hucknall About "Simplified" March 2014"

 Promo videos
 "Perfect Love"
 "Something Got Me Started"
 "A Song for You"

BBC TV Appearances
  "Perfect Love (Top of the Tops)"
 "Something Got Me Started (All Time Greatest Party Songs)"
Notes
 signifies an additional producer

Personnel 
The album credits alphabetically list the musicians who played on the record, with no indication of which musicians played on which tracks, or what instruments they played.

Credited musicians are: Sarah Brown, Anthea Clarke, Dave Clayton, Simon Hale, Geoff Holroyde, Mark Jamies, Dee Johnson, John Johnson, Ian Kirkham, Pete Lewinson, Steve Lewinson, Chris De Margary, Roachie, Kevin Robinson, Danny Saxon, Kenji Suzuki, Andy Wright, Gota Yashiki.

Danae Blanco Villanueva – guest vocals on "Perfect Love"

Oddly, Mick Hucknall is not listed in the album's musician credits.

Production 
 Johnny Wow – mixing 
 Kevin Metcalfe – mastering at The Soundmasters (London, UK)
 Andy Scade – recording, album technical coordinator 
 Dave Bloor – recording (1, 2, 3)
 Gavin Goldberg – recording (1, 2, 3)
 Michael Zimmerling – recording (1, 4–12)
 Peacock Design – art direction, design 
 Hamish Brown – band photography 
 Hugh Turvey – photography 
 Andy Dodd and Ian Grenfell, assisted by Andrea Mills in association with Lisa Barbaris – Worldwide Management

Singles
 "Perfect Love" (October 2005)
 "Something Got Me Started" / "A Song for You" (January 2006)
 "More" (November 2005) – for Brazilian market

Charts

Weekly charts

Year-end charts

Certifications

References

2005 albums
Self-released albums
Simply Red albums